DNC may refer to:

Business
Delaware North, a global food service and hospitality company formerly known as Delaware North Companies
Den norske Creditbank, a now-defunct Norwegian commercial bank

Politics
Democratic National Committee, the principal campaign and fund-raising organization affiliated with the United States Democratic Party
Democratic National Convention, a series of national conventions held every four years since 1832 by the United States Democratic Party
 Daigaku Nyushi Center, a colloquial term for the National Center for University Entrance Examinations, a Japanese government agency
Director of Naval Communications, a former United States Navy staff post
Director of Naval Construction, a former senior post in the British Admiralty
Do not call list, a registry of telephone numbers in several western countries whose owners have opted out of unsolicited telephone marketing calls
Do Not Call Register (Australia)
National Do Not Call List (Canada)
National Do Not Call Registry (United States)
United States District Court for the District of North Carolina, a former U.S. District Court

Science and technology
Declared net capacity or developed net capacity, a measure of the contribution that a power station makes to the distribution grid
Dilation and curettage (sometimes pronounced or spelled DNC) - a gynecological procedure
Dinitro-ortho-cresol, an herbicide
Direct numerical control or distributed numerical control, in manufacturing, a common term for networking CNC machine tools
Do Not Connect: a common acronym in the description of Integrated circuits connections
Desert Night Camouflage, a type of military camouflage.
Differentiable neural computer, a type of neural network architecture.

See also

 D&C (disambiguation)
 DC (disambiguation)